An antagonist is a character opposing the protagonist in literature.

Antagonist may also refer to:

Science and medicine
 Antagonist (muscle), a muscle type
 Receptor antagonist, a class of drugs that bind to but do not trigger a receptor
 Physiological antagonists, a drug that produces an opposite effect (without blocking the same receptor)

Arts and entertainment
 Antagonist A.D., a New Zealand metalcore band
 Antagonist (band), metalcore band from Whittier, California
 Antagonist (album), the debut album of the German Metalcore band Maroon
 The Antagonists (Haggard novel), a 1964 novel by William Haggard
 The Antagonists (Gann novel), a 1971 novel by Ernest K. Gann
 Antagonist, a 2007 book in the Childe Cycle by Gordon R. Dickson and David W. Wixon
 The Antagonists (TV series), a 1991 American television series

Other

See also

Inverse agonist (pharmacology)
Agonist-Antagonist (pharmacology)
O Antagonista

Antagonism (disambiguation)
Agonist (disambiguation)
Protagonist (disambiguation)